Rebecca E Duckworth (born 30 October 2000) is an English cricketer who currently plays for Lancashire. She plays as a right-handed batter. She has previously played for Cumbria, North Representative XI and North West Thunder.

Domestic career
Duckworth made her county debut in 2017, for Lancashire against Middlesex. That season, Duckworth was part of the side as Lancashire won the double of the County Championship and Twenty20 Cup. In 2019, Duckworth played two County Championship matches for Cumbria, hitting 53* in her first match and 40* in her second. In 2021, it was confirmed that Duckworth is dual-registered with both Lancashire and Cumbria, and would be part of the Cumbria squad for the upcoming season. She played four matches for Cumbria in the 2021 Women's Twenty20 Cup, scoring 108 runs including what was at the time her Twenty20 high score of 40*, against Scotland A. In the 2022 Women's Twenty20 Cup, Duckworth played for North Representative XI, and was the side's leading run-scorer, with 190 runs at an average of 38.00, including her maiden Twenty20 half-century, made against North East Warriors.

In 2020, Duckworth played for North West Thunder in the Rachael Heyhoe Flint Trophy. She appeared in four matches, scoring 66 runs at an average of 22.00, with her high score of 27 helping her side to a victory over Lightning. She appeared twice for the side in 2021, once in the Rachael Heyhoe Flint Trophy and once in the Charlotte Edwards Cup. She played once for the side in 2022, against South East Stars in the Rachael Heyhoe Flint Trophy, scoring 15. At the end of the 2022 season, it was announced that Duckworth had been released by North West Thunder.

References

External links

2000 births
Living people
Place of birth missing (living people)
Lancashire women cricketers
Cumbria women cricketers
North Representative XI cricketers
North West Thunder cricketers